LRLL 54361 also known as L54361 is thought to be a binary protostar producing strobe-like flashes, located in the constellation Perseus in the star-forming region IC 348 and 950 light-years away.

This newly discovered object may offer insight into a star's early stages of formation, when large masses of gas and dust are falling into a newly forming binary star - called a pulsed accretion model. This object emits a burst of light at regular intervals of 25.34 days, possibly caused by repeated close approaches between the two component stars which are gravitationally linked in an eccentric orbit - the flashes may be the result of large amounts of matter falling into the growing protostars. Since the stars are obscured by the dense disk and envelope of dust surrounding them, direct observation is difficult. This process of star birth has been witnessed in its later stages, but has to date not been seen in such a young system, nor with such intensity and regularity. These new stars are thought to be only a few hundred thousand years old.

LRLL 54361 was first detected by the Spitzer Space Telescope as a variable object inside the star-forming region IC 348. The Hubble Space Telescope confirmed the Spitzer observations and revealed the detailed structure around the protostar. Hubble images show two large, clear-swept regions in the disk around the stars. The monitoring of LRLL 54361 continues using other instruments, including the Herschel Space Telescope, and astronomers hope to obtain more direct measurements of the binary star and its orbit.

References

Perseus (constellation)
Protostars